Superman: Krypton Coaster is a steel roller coaster located at Six Flags Fiesta Texas amusement park in San Antonio. Manufactured by Bolliger & Mabillard, the Floorless Coaster model opened to the public in 2000 as one of the first of its kind in the world. The well-received ride held the title for the world's tallest vertical loop (145 feet) from its opening until 2013.

History
In 1999, Six Flags Great Adventure spent $42 million on new attractions including a prototype Floorless Coaster by Bolliger & Mabillard, Medusa. The immediate popularity of the ride, led to Six Flags Fiesta Texas to announce plans to install a Floorless Coaster in 2000; Superman: Krypton Coaster was announced on November 1, 1999. The announcement of the $20 million roller coaster was a part of a wider multimillion-dollar expansion of Six Flags Fiesta Texas.

At the time of the ride's announcement, construction had already begun on unused land bordered by quarry walls and an irrigation pond. The initial plans for the ride specified it would have seven inversions including a  vertical loop and a  dive loop. This saw Superman: Krypton Coaster obtain the record for the world's tallest vertical loop when it officially opened to the public on March 11, 2000. It held the title for 13 years until the addition of Full Throttle at Six Flags Magic Mountain in 2013.

On March 6, 2010, Six Flags Fiesta Texas offered exclusive ride time on Superman: Krypton Coaster to help celebrate the ride's 10th anniversary. On June 22, 2013, Superman: Krypton Coaster lost the title of having the world's tallest vertical loop when Six Flags Magic Mountain in Valencia, California  opened Full Throttle, which features a  vertical loop,  taller than the loop on Superman: Krypton Coaster.

On March 3, 2016, Six Flags announced that the roller coaster would be one of several rides at various Six Flags parks to feature a VR system. Riders have the option of wearing a Samsung Gear VR headset, powered by Oculus to create a  360-degree, 3D experience while riding. It is themed to Superman saving a city from Lex Luthor's Lex Bots who are causing chaos with an anti-gravity ray.

Characteristics

Statistics
The ride features six inversions including a  vertical loop, a zero-g roll, a  cobra roll and two corkscrews.

Trains
Superman: Krypton Coaster operates with three floorless trains. Each train seats 32 riders in eight rows of four. This gives the ride a theoretical hourly capacity of 1600 riders per hour. The open-air trains feature seats which leave riders' legs dangling above the track. Riders are restrained with over-the-shoulder restraints. As the trains are floorless, the station has a retractable floor for safe boarding.

Ride experience

After riders have boarded and the station floor is retracted, Superman: Krypton Coaster departs with a left turn out of the station. This leads directly to the  chain lift hill. At the top, the train crests the lift hill and follows a fairly level 180 degree turn to the right above the quarry wall. This leads into a  drop off the quarry wall directly into the  vertical loop. With the quarry wall on the track's right, the train inclines to the top of the wall where it performs a helix to the right. After dropping from the quarry wall again, the train enters the zero-g roll where riders experience a feeling of weightlessness. This is followed by the  cobra roll and a mid-course brake run. The exit from the mid-course brake run banks down to the right into the two interlocking corkscrews. This leads to a final turn before the final brake run and return to the station.

Reception
Prior to launch, General Manager of Six Flags Fiesta Texas John Odum stated Superman: Krypton Coaster was "the big-league ride we have really needed". He stated the design of the ride, which interacts with the quarry wall, would make a thrilling ride: "being that close to the wall there is a good sense of speed". In May 2000, two months after Superman: Krypton Coaster opened, it was reported that the park was "off to a flying start" for the season. Six Flags Fiesta Texas officials stated the ride proved popular in its first year of operation.

In Amusement Today's annual Golden Ticket Awards, Superman: Krypton Coaster was ranked in the top 50 steel roller coasters numerous times since its opening. It peaked at position 24 in 2002, before it dropped to 50 in 2008 and rose again to 38 in 2011. Since then, it has not ranked on the Golden Ticket Awards' list of top 50 steel coasters.

References

External links
 
 

Roller coasters introduced in 2000
Roller coasters in Texas
Roller coasters operated by Six Flags
Six Flags Fiesta Texas
Krypton Coaster
Warner Bros. Global Brands and Experiences attractions
Floorless Coaster roller coasters manufactured by Bolliger & Mabillard